Summer City (also known as Coast of Terror) is a 1977 Australian drama thriller film, filmed in Newcastle, Australia. The film also features Mel Gibson in his debut role.

Plot
In the early 1960s, Sandy, Boo, Scollop and Robbie drive to the beaches north of Sydney for a surfing weekend. The boys are planning to give Sandy a memorable 'one last fling' before his impending marriage. Tension flares between university-educated Sandy and ocker Boo when Sandy decides not to join in the fun. At a local dance, Boo seduces Caroline, the teenage daughter of a caravan park owner who discovers what has happened and comes looking for Boo with a gun.

Cast
Mel Gibson as Scollop
John Jarratt as Sandy
Phil Avalon as Robbie
Steve Bisley as Boo
James Elliott as Caroline's father
Debbie Forman as Caroline
Abigail as the woman in pub
Ward "Pally" Austin as himself
Judith Woodroffe as the waitress
Carl Rorke as Giuseppe
Ross Bailey as Nail
Hank Tick as Caveman
Bruce Cole as the man in car
Vicki Hekimian as Donna
Karen Williams as Gloria
Gary Tidd as Rocker in milk bar
Len Purdie as rocker in milk bar

Production
The script was autobiographical, Avalon having been a passionate surfer for most of this life and grown up in Newcastle. He also served in the army for several years (although not in Vietnam). He says he offered the script to Brian Trenchard-Smith as director, but Trenchard-Smith suggested Avalon direct it himself because he knew the subject matter so well. Avalon eventually gave the job to Chris Fraser, a young director who had another project Avalon was going to produce.

The film was shot on 16mm and blown up to 35 mm. Shooting began in October 1976 and took place near Sydney and Newcastle, especially in the town of Catherine Hill Bay.

Avalon invested $25,000 of his own money. He had another investor provide $25,000 plus twelve friends who put in $8,000.

Release
The film proved popular and had a long run. It led to a sequel Breaking Loose (1988).

References

External links 
 
Summer City at the National Film and Sound Archive
Summer City at Oz Movies
Summer City at Australian Screen Online

Australian thriller drama films
1977 films
1970s thriller drama films
Australian surfing films
1977 drama films
Films set in the 1960s
Films set in Sydney
Films shot in New South Wales
1970s English-language films
1970s Australian films